James Levesque "Bex" Shaver Sr. (May 17, 1902 – August 1, 1985) was the ninth Lieutenant Governor of Arkansas from 1943 to 1947, serving as the second lieutenant governor of Governor Homer Martin Adkins, and the first lieutenant governor of Governor Benjamin Travis Laney.
He was succeeded in 1947 by his fellow Democrat Nathan Green Gordon.

References

1902 births
1985 deaths
Lieutenant Governors of Arkansas
Arkansas Democrats
20th-century American politicians